Hopewell station is located in Hopewell, Mercer County, New Jersey, United States. The station was built in 1876. The head house has been on the state and federal registers of historic places since 1984 and was originally listed as part of the Operating Passenger Railroad Stations Thematic Resource. New Jersey Transit has proposed reopening the station to railroad service as part of the West Trenton Line.

History
The Delaware and Bound Brook Railroad built the station in 1876 as part of the planned National Railway route between New York City and Washington, D.C. The station was leased by the Philadelphia and Reading Railway in 1879. Train service to the station was terminated in 1982.

Gallery

See also
National Register of Historic Places listings in Mercer County, New Jersey
List of New Jersey Transit stations

Bibliography

References

Second Empire architecture in New Jersey
Railway stations in the United States opened in 1876
Railway stations in Mercer County, New Jersey
Railway stations on the National Register of Historic Places in New Jersey
Former Reading Company stations
Former railway stations in New Jersey
National Register of Historic Places in Mercer County, New Jersey
Hopewell, New Jersey
New Jersey Register of Historic Places
Former SEPTA Regional Rail stations
Railway stations closed in 1982